Viktoria Vitaliyevna Semenjuk (born 13 March 2001) is a Belarusian-Estonian ice dancer. She is currently paired with Ilya Yukhimuk representing Belarus, where they are the 2021 Belarusian national champion.

Representing Estonia with her former skating partner, Artur Gruzdev, she has competed in the final segment at two World Junior Championships (2018, 2019). They placed tenth at the 2016 Winter Youth Olympics.

Programs 
 With Yukhimuk

 With Gruzdev

Competitive highlights 
GP: Grand Prix; CS: Challenger Series; JGP: Junior Grand Prix

 With Yukhimuk for Belarus

With Gruzdev for Estonia

With Sokolov for Estonia

Detailed results 
ISU Personal Bests highlighted in bold.

 With Yukhimuk

References

External links 
 
 

2001 births
Living people
Estonian female ice dancers
Belarusian female ice dancers
Figure skaters at the 2016 Winter Youth Olympics
Figure skaters from Tallinn